Esko Moravian-Silesian Region is a commuter rail system in the Moravian-Silesian Region of the Czech Republic. The integrated system began on 14 December 2008. Esko is part of the ODIS Integrated Transport system serving the Moravian-Silesian Region. The Esko trains are operated by České dráhy, the state railway operator

Lines

References

External links
 Network map

Railway lines in the Czech Republic
Moravian-Silesian Region